Alfred Edward Waterson (5 August 1880, Derby – 25 November 1964) was a Labour and Co-operative Member of Parliament in the United Kingdom. He was the first Co-operative Party MP.

Born in Derby, Waterson was a railwayman and activist in his trade union. He served as a town councillor.

Although the Co-operative Party put up several candidates for the first time at the 1918 general election, only one met with success. Waterson was elected as MP for the Kettering seat. He took the Labour whip in Parliament, ahead of any decision of Co-operative Congress to progress a formal alliance with the Labour Party.

Waterson was defeated at the 1922 general election.  He became a national organiser of the Co-operative Party, serving until 1945.  He contested the Nottingham Central by-election in 1930, and stood in Nottingham Central at the 1931 general election, coming a distant second in each case. He died in Wood Green, London aged 84.

References

External links 
Co-operative News article on Waterson's election

External links 
 

1880 births
1964 deaths
Labour Co-operative MPs for English constituencies
UK MPs 1918–1922
Politicians from Derby